Častrov is a municipality and village in Pelhřimov District in the Vysočina Region of the Czech Republic. It has about 600 inhabitants.

Administrative parts
Villages of Ctiboř, Jakubín, Metánov, Pelec and Perky are administrative parts of Častrov.

References

Villages in Pelhřimov District